is an Echizen Railway Mikuni Awara Line railway station located in the city of Fukui, Fukui Prefecture, Japan.

Lines

Station layout
The station consists of one island platform and one side platform; however, only the side platform is in use, and serves a single bi-directional track. The station is unattended. The wooden station building is protected by the government as a Registered Tangible Cultural Property.

Adjacent stations

History
Washizuka-Haribara Station was opened on December 30, 1928. On September 1, 1942 the Keifuku Electric Railway merged with Mikuni Awara Electric Railway. Operations were halted from June 25, 2001. The station reopened on August 10, 2003 as an Echizen Railway station.

Surrounding area
Washizuka-Haribara Station borders Sakai City in the north of Fukui City. The Fukui area is known as Washizuka; the corresponding area in nearby Sakai is Haribara.
Rice fields surround the station. There is a small farming community in the vicinity, with homes and shops a further distance to the east. 
Other points of interest include:
Fukui Prefecture Drivers Education Center (800 meters north)
Fukui - Ishikawa Prefectural Route 5 (Awara Kaidō)
Kawai Post Office

See also
 List of railway stations in Japan

References

External links

  

Railway stations in Fukui Prefecture
Railway stations in Japan opened in 1928
Mikuni Awara Line
Fukui (city)